The University of Pennsylvania Health System (UPHS) is a major multi-hospital health system headquartered in Philadelphia, Pennsylvania. UPHS and the Perelman School of Medicine at the University of Pennsylvania together comprise Penn Medicine, a clinical and research entity of the University of Pennsylvania. UPHS hospitals include the Hospital of the University of Pennsylvania, Penn Presbyterian Medical Center, Pennsylvania Hospital, Chester County Hospital, Lancaster General Hospital, and Princeton Medical Center.

The UPHS is home to the first hospital in the United States, the Pennsylvania Hospital.

History

The Chester County Hospital and Health System joined UPHS in 2013. Two years later, Lancaster General Health (LG Health) joined the UPHS family. Princeton Health officially merged into UPHS in January 2018.

Phoenixville Hospital in Phoenixville, Pennsylvania, was previously part of the UPHS network but was sold to Community Health Systems in 2004. Phoenixville Hospital was sold again by CHS to Tower Health in 2017.

In 2020, University of Pennsylvania-Penn Presbyterian was ranked as the 15th best hospital in the United States by the U.S. News & World Report.

Major facilities

References

Health System
Hospital networks in the United States
1993 establishments in Pennsylvania
Perelman School of Medicine at the University of Pennsylvania